Mari-Leena Hannele Talvitie is a Finnish politician currently serving in the Parliament of Finland for the National Coalition Party at the Oulu constituency.

References

1980 births
Living people
People from Vaasa
National Coalition Party politicians
Members of the Parliament of Finland (2015–19)
Members of the Parliament of Finland (2019–23)
21st-century Finnish women politicians
Women members of the Parliament of Finland